Huard may refer to: 


Surname
 Bill Huard (born 1967), Canadian National Hockey League player
 Brock Huard (born 1976), American football quarterback
 Camille Huard (born 1951), Canadian boxer
 Damon Huard (born 1973), American football quarterback
 Frances Wilson Huard (1885–1969), American-born writer, translator, and lecturer 
 Gaëtan Huard (born 1962), French footballer
 Laurent Huard (born 1973), French football coach, player and assistant manager
 Patrick Huard, Canadian actor, comedian and film maker
 Pierre Huard (1901–1983), French professor of medicine
 Victor-Alphonse Huard (1853–1929), French-Canadian churchman, naturalist, writer, editor, educator and promoter of the natural sciences
 Huard family, characters in the 2006 film Annapolis

Places
 Huard River, Quebec, Canada
 Huard Lake, Quebec

Slang
 French-Canadian slang for a Canadian dollar

See also
 Abbé Huard River, Quebec
 Abbé Huard Lake, Quebec